Mary Winslow may refer to:

Mary Winslow, wife of John Sibley (doctor)
Mary Blythe Winslow, sponsor of the USS Winslow
Mary Chilton (1607–1679), or Mary Chilton Winslow after marriage
Mary Matilda Winslow, first Black Canadian female graduate of the University of New Brunswick
Mary Nelson Winslow,  U.S. Department of Labor Women's Bureau leader and Inter-American Commission of Women delegate